Pseudomonas simiae is a Gram-negative, catalase- and oxidase-positive, rod-shaped bacterium isolated from  monkeys (Callithrix geoffroyi). The type strain is CCUG 50988.

References

External links
Type strain of Pseudomonas simiae at BacDive -  the Bacterial Diversity Metadatabase

Pseudomonadales
Bacteria described in 2006